FAHA may refer to:

 Finnish American Home Association (non-profit organization founded by the Finnish community of northern California)

 Fellow of the American Heart Association
 Fellow of the Australian Academy of the Humanities